Divya Pratap Singh (born 1 October 1992) is an Indian cricketer. He made his List A debut for Rajasthan in the 2013–14 Vijay Hazare Trophy on 27 February 2014.

References

External links
 

1992 births
Living people
Indian cricketers
Rajasthan cricketers
Cricketers from Rajasthan